The 1992 AFL season was the 96th season of the Australian Football League (AFL), the highest level senior Australian rules football competition in Australia, which was known as the Victorian Football League until 1989. The season featured fifteen clubs, ran from 21 March until 26 September, and comprised a 22-game home-and-away season followed by a finals series featuring the top six clubs.

Prior to the season, the AFL ceased its role as the administrative body for football in Victoria after 95 years: this role was transferred, along with control of the reserves competition, to the newly established Victorian State Football League (VSFL). Subsequently, the Victorian AFL clubs' under-19s competition was dissolved, and zone-based recruiting was abolished.

The premiership was won by the West Coast Eagles, after it defeated  by 28 points in the 1992 AFL Grand Final. It was West Coast's first premiership, and also the first premiership won by a non-Victorian club following the league's interstate expansion.

Foster's Cup

Premiership season

Round 1

Round 2

Round 3

Round 4

Round 5

Round 6

Round 7

Round 8

Round 9

|- style="background:#ccf;"
| Home team
| Home team score
| Away team
| Away team score
| Ground
| Crowd
| Date
|- style="background:#fff;"
||| 9.12 (66) |||| 15.15 (105) ||MCG || 17,371 ||Friday 15, May
|- style="background:#fff;"
||| 11.16 (82) |||| 15.16 (106) ||Princes Park|| 19,077 ||Saturday 16, May
|- style="background:#fff;"
||| 17.22 (124) |||| 28.13 (181) ||MCG || 41,244 ||Saturday 16, May
|- style="background:#fff;"
||| 18.12 (120) |||| 7.6 (48) ||Waverley Park || 22,686 ||Saturday 16, May
|- style="background:#fff;"
||| 6.6 (42) |||| 11.18 (84) ||Carrara Stadium || 3,059 ||Sunday 17, May
|- style="background:#fff;"
||| 19.20 (134) |||| 14.18 (102) ||MCG || 17,487 ||Sunday 17, May
|- style="background:#fff;"
||| 9.10 (64) |||| 9.15 (69) ||Football Park || 44,723 ||Sunday 17, May

Round 10

|- style="background:#ccf;"
| Home team
| Home team score
| Away team
| Away team score
| Ground
| Crowd
| Date
|- style="background:#fff;"
||| 17.16 (118) |||| 11.12 (78) ||WACA|| 23,046 ||Friday 22, May
|- style="background:#fff;"
||| 18.8 (116) |||| 7.22 (64) ||Princes Park|| 27,993 ||Saturday 23, May
|- style="background:#fff;"
||| 9.12 (66) |||| 12.9 (81) ||Waverley Park || 60,228 ||Saturday 23, May
|- style="background:#fff;"
||| 16.11 (107) |||| 13.12 (90) ||Whitten Oval || 18,508 ||Saturday 23, May
|- style="background:#fff;"
||| 21.14 (140) |||| 16.8 (104) ||MCG || 18,634 ||Saturday 23, May
|- style="background:#fff;"
||| 25.18 (168) |||| 9.6 (60) ||Moorabbin Oval || 18,360 ||Saturday 23, May
|- style="background:#fff;"
||| 12.13 (85) |||| 21.20 (146) ||SCG|| 12,217 ||Sunday 24, May

Round 11

|- style="background:#ccf;"
| Home team
| Home team score
| Away team
| Away team score
| Ground
| Crowd
| Date
|- style="background:#fff;"
||| 10.5 (65) |||| 14.15 (99) ||Waverley Park || 30,177 ||Saturday 30, May
|- style="background:#fff;"
||| 13.14 (92) |||| 13.11 (89) ||Princes Park|| 25,343 ||Saturday 30, May
|- style="background:#fff;"
||| 19.15 (129) |||| 18.18 (126) ||Kardinia Park || 22,429 ||Saturday 30, May
|- style="background:#fff;"
||| 22.10 (142) |||| 11.17 (83) ||MCG || 13,174 ||Saturday 30, May
|- style="background:#fff;"
||| 16.20 (116) |||| 10.13 (73) ||MCG || 20,476 ||Sunday 31, May
|- style="background:#fff;"
||| 16.13 (109) |||| 11.9 (75) ||Whitten Oval || 25,829 ||Sunday 31, May
|- style="background:#fff;"
||| 21.16 (142) |||| 16.11 (107) ||Football Park || 36,312 ||Sunday 31, May

Round 12

Round 13

Round 14

|- style="background:#ccf;"
| Home team
| Home team score
| Away team
| Away team score
| Ground
| Crowd
| Date
|- style="background:#fff;"
||| 20.17 (137) |||| 16.6 (102) ||MCG || 6,396 ||Friday 19, June
|- style="background:#fff;"
||| 20.13 (133) |||| 17.12 (114) ||Princes Park|| 21,405 ||Saturday 20, June
|- style="background:#fff;"
||| 8.12 (60) |||| 11.8 (74) ||Waverley Park || 26,346 ||Saturday 20, June
|- style="background:#fff;"
||| 15.18 (108) |||| 24.13 (157) ||MCG || 30,922 ||Saturday 20, June
|- style="background:#fff;"
||| 11.16 (82) |||| 11.10 (76) ||MCG || 67,835 ||Sunday 21, June
|- style="background:#fff;"
||| 11.17 (83) |||| 24.14 (158) ||SCG|| 11,132 ||Sunday 21, June
|- style="background:#fff;"
||| 14.8 (92) |||| 21.10 (136) ||Football Park || 43,163 ||Sunday 21, June

Round 15

Round 16

|- style="background:#ccf;"
| Home team
| Home team score
| Away team
| Away team score
| Ground
| Crowd
| Date
|- style="background:#fff;"
||| 15.19 (109) |||| 13.9 (87) ||WACA|| 23,182 ||Friday 3, July
|- style="background:#fff;"
||| 27.17 (179) |||| 12.8 (80) ||Princes Park|| 11,693 ||Saturday 4, July
|- style="background:#fff;"
||| 24.17 (161) |||| 14.14 (98) ||Victoria Park|| 31,168 ||Saturday 4, July
|- style="background:#fff;"
||| 16.15 (111) |||| 11.17 (83) ||MCG || 42,461 ||Saturday 4, July
|- style="background:#fff;"
||| 22.11 (143) |||| 8.8 (56) ||Waverley Park || 13,235 ||Saturday 4, July
|- style="background:#fff;"
||| 14.11 (95) |||| 16.18 (114) ||Kardinia Park || 26,257 ||Saturday 4, July
|- style="background:#fff;"
||| 11.17 (83) |||| 21.10 (136) ||SCG|| 7,329 ||Sunday 5, July

Round 17

|- style="background:#ccf;"
| Home team
| Home team score
| Away team
| Away team score
| Ground
| Crowd
| Date
|- style="background:#fff;"
||| 7.12 (54) |||| 9.12 (66) ||Waverley Park || 52,481 ||Saturday 11, July
|- style="background:#fff;"
||| 11.18 (84) |||| 15.7 (97) ||Moorabbin Oval || 27,347 ||Saturday 11, July
|- style="background:#fff;"
||| 21.10 (136) |||| 8.15 (63) ||Kardinia Park || 19,829 ||Saturday 11, July
|- style="background:#fff;"
||| 18.11 (119) |||| 17.16 (118) ||Princes Park|| 11,089 ||Saturday 11, July
|- style="background:#fff;"
||| 9.10 (64) |||| 14.19 (103) ||Carrara Stadium || 13,053 ||Saturday 11, July
|- style="background:#fff;"
||| 10.17 (77) |||| 11.14 (80) ||North Hobart Oval || 10,265 ||Sunday 12, July
|- style="background:#fff;"
||| 16.11 (107) |||| 8.6 (54) ||Subiaco Oval || 28,397 ||Sunday 12, July

Round 18

|- style="background:#ccf;"
| Home team
| Home team score
| Away team
| Away team score
| Ground
| Crowd
| Date
|- style="background:#fff;"
||| 14.12 (96) |||| 17.12 (114) ||SCG|| 15,240 ||Friday 17, July
|- style="background:#fff;"
||| 13.15 (93) |||| 10.17 (77) ||MCG || 44,142 ||Saturday 18, July
|- style="background:#fff;"
||| 10.13 (73) |||| 16.18 (114) ||Princes Park|| 6,461 ||Saturday 18, July
|- style="background:#fff;"
||| 20.13 (133) |||| 14.12 (96) ||Waverley Park || 17,096 ||Saturday 18, July
|- style="background:#fff;"
||| 12.11 (83) |||| 24.21 (165) ||MCG || 26,131 ||Sunday 19, July
|- style="background:#fff;"
||| 9.13 (67) |||| 18.8 (116) ||Football Park || 31,963 ||Sunday 19, July
|- style="background:#fff;"
||| 15.5 (95) |||| 3.11 (29) ||Waverley Park || 24,691 ||Sunday 19, July

Round 19

|- style="background:#ccf;"
| Home team
| Home team score
| Away team
| Away team score
| Ground
| Crowd
| Date
|- style="background:#fff;"
||| 10.23 (83) |||| 8.13 (61) ||MCG || 88,066 ||Friday 24, July
|- style="background:#fff;"
||| 15.18 (108) |||| 15.11 (101) ||Princes Park|| 17,079 ||Saturday 25, July
|- style="background:#fff;"
||| 15.13 (103) |||| 8.9 (57) ||Whitten Oval || 12,742 ||Saturday 25, July
|- style="background:#fff;"
||| 12.5 (77) |||| 15.6 (96) ||Kardinia Park || 25,585 ||Saturday 25, July
|- style="background:#fff;"
||| 7.13 (55) |||| 19.16 (130) ||Waverley Park || 43,132 ||Saturday 25, July
|- style="background:#fff;"
||| 23.12 (150) |||| 10.15 (75) ||MCG || 20,184 ||Saturday 25, July
|- style="background:#fff;"
||| 21.6 (132) |||| 7.5 (47) ||Football Park || 25,597 ||Saturday 25, July

Round 20

Round 21

|- style="background:#ccf;"
| Home team
| Home team score
| Away team
| Away team score
| Ground
| Crowd
| Date
|- style="background:#fff;"
||| 15.21 (111) |||| 11.14 (80) ||MCG || 9,739 ||Friday 7, August
|- style="background:#fff;"
||| 11.16 (82) |||| 8.15 (63) ||Waverley Park || 53,369 ||Saturday 8, August
|- style="background:#fff;"
||| 13.16 (94) |||| 19.12 (126) ||MCG || 25,508 ||Saturday 8, August
|- style="background:#fff;"
||| 10.8 (68) |||| 17.18 (120) ||Princes Park|| 11,871 ||Saturday 8, August
|- style="background:#fff;"
||| 12.15 (87) |||| 18.14 (122) ||Waverley Park || 50,883 ||Sunday 9, August
|- style="background:#fff;"
||| 15.14 (104) |||| 12.12 (84) ||Subiaco Oval || 23,245 ||Sunday 9, August
|- style="background:#fff;"
||| 11.11 (77) |||| 17.8 (110) ||Carrara Stadium || 4,603 ||Sunday 9, August

Round 22

|- style="background:#ccf;"
| Home team
| Home team score
| Away team
| Away team score
| Ground
| Crowd
| Date
|- style="background:#fff;"
||| 14.22 (106) |||| 10.16 (76) ||WACA|| 23,016 ||Friday 14, August
|- style="background:#fff;"
||| 19.22 (136) |||| 7.12 (54) ||Princes Park|| 31,375 ||Saturday 15, August
|- style="background:#fff;"
||| 23.13 (151) |||| 9.4 (58) ||Kardinia Park || 17,187 ||Saturday 15, August
|- style="background:#fff;"
||| 13.8 (86) |||| 25.20 (170) ||MCG || 20,423 ||Saturday 15, August
|- style="background:#fff;"
||| 14.8 (92) |||| 14.14 (98) ||MCG || 35,253 ||Sunday 16, August
|- style="background:#fff;"
||| 13.10 (88) |||| 21.13 (139) ||SCG|| 8,656 ||Sunday 16, August
|- style="background:#fff;"
||| 13.15 (93) |||| 10.17 (77) ||Football Park || 38,675 ||Sunday 16, August

Round 23

|- style="background:#ccf;"
| Home team
| Home team score
| Away team
| Away team score
| Ground
| Crowd
| Date
|- style="background:#fff;"
||| 12.14 (86) |||| 15.12 (102) ||Waverley Park || 77,357 ||Saturday 22, August
|- style="background:#fff;"
||| 20.19 (139) |||| 10.11 (71) ||MCG || 21,044 ||Saturday 22, August
|- style="background:#fff;"
||| 20.13 (133) |||| 14.14 (98) ||Princes Park|| 9,244 ||Saturday 22, August
|- style="background:#fff;"
||| 19.15 (129) |||| 9.16 (70) ||Carrara Stadium || 4,349 ||Saturday 22, August
|- style="background:#fff;"
||| 7.11 (53) |||| 3.5 (23) ||Whitten Oval || 15,695 ||Sunday 23, August
|- style="background:#fff;"
||| 24.25 (169) |||| 11.12 (78) ||Football Park || 46,543 ||Sunday 23, August
|- style="background:#fff;"
||| 6.7 (43) |||| 8.10 (58) ||MCG || 30,548 ||Sunday 23, August

Round 24

|- style="background:#ccf;"
| Home team
| Home team score
| Away team
| Away team score
| Ground
| Crowd
| Date
|- style="background:#fff;"
||| 13.17 (95) |||| 18.17 (125) ||SCG|| 7,466 ||Friday 28, August
|- style="background:#fff;"
||| 13.9 (87) |||| 11.16 (82) ||Victoria Park|| 28,990 ||Saturday 29, August
|- style="background:#fff;"
||| 16.14 (110) |||| 9.10 (64) ||Waverley Park || 42,968 ||Saturday 29, August
|- style="background:#fff;"
||| 14.12 (96) |||| 19.16 (130) ||Princes Park|| 8,830 ||Saturday 29, August
|- style="background:#fff;"
||| 19.17 (131) |||| 11.8 (74) ||Whitten Oval || 15,390 ||Saturday 29, August
|- style="background:#fff;"
||| 20.10 (130) |||| 22.17 (149) ||MCG || 42,549 ||Saturday 29, August
|- style="background:#fff;"
||| 18.12 (120) |||| 12.15 (87) ||Subiaco Oval || 40,441 ||Sunday 30, August

Ladder
All teams played 22 games during the home and away season, for a total of 165. An additional 7 games were played during the finals series.

Finals series

The AFL used a modified version of the McIntyre final six, after criticism of the original final six system. The difference to the original version was that First Semi-final would be contested between the loser of the qualifying final and the Elimination Final winner which had finished in a lower qualifying position on the ladder, while the second Semi-final would be contested between the winner of the qualifying final and the Elimination Final winner which had finished in a higher qualifying position on the ladder. This system would be retained for the following season before being replaced by the McIntyre final eight system.

Elimination Finals

Qualifying final

Semi-finals

|- style="background:#ccf;"
| Home team
| Score
| Away team
| Score
| Venue
| Attendance
| Date
|- style="background:#fff;"
| 
| 19.5 (119)
| 
| 14.6 (90)
| Waverley Park
| 59,512
| Saturday, 12 September
|- style="background:#fff;"
| 
| 14.11 (95)
| 
| 20.13 (133)
| MCG
| 71,745
| Sunday, 13 September

Preliminary final

|- style="background:#ccf;"
| Home team
| Score
| Away team
| Score
| Venue
| Attendance
| Date
|- style="background:#fff;"
| 
| 22.17 (149)
| 
| 12.13 (85)
| MCG
| 71,841
| Saturday, 19 September

Grand Final

|- style="background:#ccf;"
| Home team
| Score
| Away team
| Score
| Venue
| Attendance
| Date
|- style="background:#fff;"
| 
| 16.17 (113)
| 
| 12.13 (85)
| MCG
| 95,007
| Saturday, 26 September

Awards 

Notable events 
 The minor grades and recruitment processes for Victorian clubs in the AFL competition underwent significant changes for the 1992 season:
 Firstly, zone-based recruiting was abolished, firmly establishing the AFL Draft as the primary mechanism for player recruitment.
 Secondly, the AFL ceased its role as the administrative body for football in Victoria after 95 years, with the Victorian State Football League (VSFL) being established as a new administrative body to oversee football in Victoria.
 Thirdly, the VSFL also took control of the AFL Reserves competition: this change was only administrative, with the VSFL serving as a continuation of the AFL Reserves.
 Fourthly, the AFL Under-19s competition (along with the twelve AFL clubs' under-19s teams) was dissolved, to be replaced by the VSFL's new Under-18s competition (later known as the TAC Cup and subsequently the NAB League) that featured six district-based clubs not affiliated with any AFL club.
 Geelong also set records for most points scored in a home-and-away season (3,057) and in all games (3,558), which have not been broken as of 2022.
 The Round 9 match between the Brisbane Bears and Footscray on a rainy Sunday at Carrara saw only 3,059 attend. This remains the lowest attendance at a VFL/AFL match since the war-affected 1942 season.  
 In Round 23, in torrential rain at the Western Oval, West Coast kicked only 0.2 (2) to three-quarter time. This is the lowest three-quarter time score since 1953.
 The first McIntyre "final six" system, which had operated in 1991, was replaced by the second McIntyre "final six" system. The second McIntyre "final six" system lasted two seasons; it was replaced by the McIntyre "final eight" system in 1994.
 The Round 20 match between St. Kilda and Fitzroy was the last senior AFL game to be played at Moorabbin Oval, which had been home to the Saints for twenty-eight seasons beginning in 1965. St. Kilda would play their home games at Waverley Park for the remainder of the 1990s before permanently moving to Docklands Stadium in 2000. St. Kilda's AFLW team has played its home games at Moorabbin since its 2019 formation.

See also
 second McIntyre "final six" system

References

Bibliography

External links
 1992 Season - AFL Tables

 
AFL season
1992